Lucas Bennett may refer to:

Lucas Bennett, protagonist in The Impossible (2012 film)
Lucas Bennett (Person of Interest)